The Volvo VESC, the Volvo Experimental Safety Car, was a concept car made by Volvo to showcase a number of innovative passenger safety features. It was unveiled in 1972 at the Geneva Motor Show.

History 

In the late 1960s, Volvo had a first project with a focus on passenger safety called P1560, which resulted in a few different prototype models being made. The project was canceled in 1971, partly because of uncertainties about future safety rules - especially in the United States.

The following project was oriented along the contemporary Experimental Safety Vehicle (ESV) projects of US car companies. Using a V8 engine, it would be significantly larger than previous Volvo models. The plan called for ten prototypes, as a number had already been built into a new car model that would complement the 140 Series and become a replacement for Volvo 164.
This project was also canceled, but a lot of the design and the already finished prototypes were used for the VESC project.

Safety concepts 

For resilience against a side collision, the car had strong reinforcements and crumple zones in the doors.
VESC would cope with a roof before reaching 2.4 m height without pushing more than 75 mm.
The headrests were folded into the seats and folded upwards. 

Other features of the Volvo VESC were anti-lock brakes, back-up warning signal, integrated roll cage, three-point seatbelts which pulled tight during a crash, front and rear airbags, headlamp washers and wipers, automatic ride height control, center mounted fuel tank, automatic fuel shutoff mechanism, warning lights in the doors and an early rear-view camera provided by Mitsubishi Electric that used a 6.5-mm Cosmicar lens mounted between the rear taillights sending footage to a television screen in the cabin.

Outcome 

Much of the car - especially the front - heavily influenced the upcoming 200 series, launched in 1974.

A Volvo VESC is on display at the Volvo Museum in Gothenburg.

References 

VESC
Automotive safety